Djavan Anderson (born 21 April 1995) is a Dutch professional footballer who plays as a midfielder or right-back for English club Oxford United.

Club career

Ajax
Anderson began his football career with AFC in Amsterdam before joining the Ajax Youth Academy in 2010. He had briefly interrupted his football career to pursue a career in gymnastics, before returning to football. On 23 April 2012, Anderson signed his first professional contract with Ajax, binding him to the club until 30 June 2015. During the 2013–14 season Anderson began playing for the Ajax A1 selection, the under-19 side of the club, making three appearances in the UEFA Youth League, the Champions League equivalent for under-19 teams. Due to the absence of several reserves, who were competing Internationally on Matchday 7 of the Eerste Divisie, Anderson made his professional debut playing for the reserves team Jong Ajax in the away match against Achilles '29, which ended in a 2–1 loss. After the winter break in January it was announced that he would not return to the under-19 squad and would remain with Jong Ajax for the remainder of the season, making eight appearances in total.

AZ
On 19 June 2014, it was announced that Anderson would transfer to AZ. With newly appointed head coach Marco van Basten taking a particular interest in the young player, a transfer fee of €200,000 was agreed upon between the two clubs, with Anderson signing on for three years. He made his Eredivisie debut on 8 November 2014 in a 1–0 away win against NAC Breda.

Cambuur
On 19 August 2015, it was announced that Anderson had signed a two-year contract with Eredivisie side SC Cambuur.

Bari 
On 7 September 2017, it was announced that Anderson had signed with Bari in the Italian Serie B.

Lazio
On 27 July 2018, Djavan signed for Serie A side Lazio for free.

Salernitana (loan)
On 17 August 2018, Djavan joined Serie B club Salernitana on loan until 30 June 2019.

PEC Zwolle (loan)
On 31 January 2022, Anderson returned to the Netherlands and joined PEC Zwolle on loan until the end of the season.

Oxford United
On 1 September 2022, Anderson signed for Oxford United on a one-year deal, with an option for a further year. On 13 September, he made his league debut for the club, coming on in the 75th minute in a 1–0 defeat to Plymouth Argyle. On 29 October, Anderson scored his first goal for the club in a 3–1 win against Bolton Wanderers.

International career
Born in the Netherlands, Anderson is of Jamaican and Surinamese descent On 2 February 2012, Anderson made his debut for the Netherlands under-17 side in a match at the XXXV Torneio Int. do Algarve '12 against France U-17 in a 1–0 victory. He was a part of the Netherlands U17 team to compete in the 2012 UEFA European Under-17 Championship in Slovenia where the Dutch secured their second title in the competition, playing in all matches and helping his team to defeat Germany U-17 in the final. On 11 September 2012 Anderson made his debut for the Netherlands under-18 squad in a friendly match against the United States U-18. The match ended in a 4–2 loss.

In March 2022 he was called up for Suriname for a friendly match against Thailand.

Career statistics

Honours
Netherlands U17
 UEFA European Under-17 Football Championship: 2012

References

External links

1995 births
Living people
Footballers from Amsterdam
Association football fullbacks
Dutch footballers
Netherlands youth international footballers
Dutch people of Jamaican descent
Sportspeople of Jamaican descent
Dutch sportspeople of Surinamese descent
Jong Ajax players
AZ Alkmaar players
SC Cambuur players
S.S.C. Bari players
S.S. Lazio players
U.S. Salernitana 1919 players
Cosenza Calcio players
PEC Zwolle players
Oxford United F.C. players
Serie B players
Serie A players
Eredivisie players
Eerste Divisie players
Dutch expatriate footballers
Expatriate footballers in Italy
Dutch expatriate sportspeople in Italy
Expatriate footballers in England
Dutch expatriate sportspeople in England